A student council (also known as a student union, associated student body or student parliament) is an administrative organization of students in different educational institutes ranging from elementary schools to universities and research organizations around the world. These councils exist in most public and private K-12 school systems in different countries. Many universities, both private and public, have a student council as an apex body of all their students' organisations. Student councils often serve to engage students in learning about democracy and leadership, as originally espoused by John Dewey in Democracy and Education (1917).

Function
The student council helps share ideas, interests, and concerns with teachers and institute administrative authorities. It also help raise funds for school-wide activities, including social events, community projects, helping people in need and school reform. Most schools participate in food drives, fundraisers and parties.  Many members learn skills that were an extension of their formal education.

Student councils operate in many forms. There are representative-based and modeled loosely after the U.S. Congress, or based on the Executive Branch of the United States, with a President, vice-president, secretary, treasurer, and reporter. In this form student representatives and officers are usually elected from and by the student body, although there may be prerequisites for candidacy or suffrage. In elementary schools, there are typically one or two student representatives per classroom and one presiding set of officers. However, many secondary schools have one set of officers per grade level.

An example of the structure of an elementary student council may include a president, a vice president, secretary, treasurer, sergeant of arms, fundraising officer, historian, boys rep, girls rep, and just members. These roles may be assigned or voted on, either within the student council or by the entire student body. They may also reflect descending grade-levels, with the president in the oldest grade, and so forth. Secondary school governments often have more independence and power than younger governments. Often a student government is overseen by a sponsor, which is usually a teacher at that particular school. Most junior or middle school student councils have a constitution of some sort and usually do not have a judicial branch. Compared to elementary school councils, junior high and high school councils generally have fewer people.

In some schools, a student council representative is assigned to each class. That person passes on requests, ideas and complaints from students in that class to the student council. In other schools, the elected Class Officers are automatically members of the student council.

Student councils usually do not have funding authority and generally must generate their operating funds through fundraisers such as car washes and bake sales. Some student councils have a budget from the school, along with responsibility for funding a variety of student activities within a school.

Regional and national structures

Student councils can join larger associations, and in the United States, the National Association of Student Councils. In Canada, the Canadian Student Leadership Association coordinates the national scene, and in the United Kingdom an organization called involver provides training, support and coordination for the nation's student councils

Argentina

Bulgaria 
In Bulgaria most of the universities have a student council, regulated by law and the regulations of each university.

Canada 
In Canada, the student council is used for helping the school with special events and planning other events. As well student councils in Canada also act as a body to advocate for student issues like tuitions.

Chile

Finland 
Secondary high schools, lukio, and vocational schools in Finland have student councils. They incorporate all the students of the institution, but their status is marginal, locally and nationally. Legislation demands that they should be heard in all matters pertaining to the education in the institution, but this is often not done.

Germany 

Student representation is very important in the German school system. Each state in the Federal Republic of Germany has its own peculiarities in the system, but they are by and large similar. Although education in Germany is a matter for the federal states, there is a Federal student Conference where all state student councils can elect delegates to participate and exchange views on nationwide problems that arise in education. Every school in Germany has a student council. According to the student Council, every district has a District student council. At the municipal level, these councils deal with the school authorities and with the individual institutions, such as school offices, etc. Above this there is a state student representation in each state, where delegates from each district of the respective state come to exchange ideas. This body is granted extensive rights such as a budget of between €40,000 and €70,000 for material costs, but is also obliged to consult with the Ministry of Education when important decisions are made.

Greece 
In Greece, student representation is considered the limestone of democracy. All public secondary schools have a student council which consists of 15 members: a president, a vice-president, a secretary and 12 equal voting members. Additionally, all classes have a separate student council which consists of 5 members: a president, a secretary, a treasurer and 2 equal voting members.

Hong Kong 
In Hong Kong, some secondary schools have student councils, while some have Students' Unions. Student councils are directly elected by the student population, and are formed by the winning cabinet. A hierarchical structure is maintained, with positions like Secretaries/Coordinators for internal and external affairs, Treasurer, Vice-chairpersons and chairperson. Student councils represent the student body, organise events and provide welfare for students.

India 
In India, student councils are rare in elementary and middle schools. They are established in many secondary and higher secondary schools and are most commonly instituted in universities.

Student councils in India may be elected, nominated or selected after interview (or written examination or both). In universities, they are elected by ballot.

Indonesia 

The student councils in Indonesia are officially formed by the government and is called OSIS (abbreviation of Organisasi Siswa Intra Sekolah, Interschool Organization of Students). OSIS is present in both junior high school and high school. Every year, the committee which usually consists of teachers and former student council members hold a selection process to admit students who meet qualifications to join OSIS, while the president is voted by students of the school. In some practices, the teachers can also vote depending on their own regulation.

Iran 
In Iran, each November since 1997, elementary, secondary, and high school students at each school in the nation elect between 5-14 Student Council members, which act as the main medium of communication and debate between the student body and school officials. The size of the Council at each school depends largely on the class size and school policies. Student councils in Iran mainly promote interpersonal and leadership skills, constructive debates between school officials and the students, and the organization of school activities and field trips.

There is also a "Student council of the Provinces " from among the heads of the city student councils, and the heads of these councils, who are 9th or 10th-grade students, are several boys and girls, as representatives of their Provinces students In the "student council parliament" ( Student council of the country ) which is actually similar to the Islamic Consultative Assembly (Parliament of Iran).11th "student council parliament" in Iran will start functioning in late march and Soufia Askari (10th-grade student in Farzanegan high school ) is one of the representers of Hormozgan Province.

Each province has between 2 and 4 representatives and these representatives are officially and legally responsible for leading and addressing the problems of students in their Provinces and improving the education system; The members of the "student council parliament" in Iran are elected for a period of 2 years and during this period they have at least 2 official sessions in the main parliament of the country, with the presence of the Minister of Education and can express their demands and suggestions directly with the Minister of Education. Students and officials in Iran attach great importance to choosing a smart person and a very strong leader to represent their school, city, province, and country.

Ireland 
Since 1998 in Ireland there has been sustained development of student councils in post primary schools. In 2008 the Irish Second Level Students Union was founded as the National Umbrella body to organise and coordinate the national campaign efforts of the student councils. The Union is also a member of OBESSU. Schools and staff are advised to assist the creation of a student council under section 27 of The Education Act 1998

Israel 

Israel's national student and youth council (Hebrew: מועצת התלמידים והנוער הארצית) is an elected body representing all youth in Israel since 1993. Representatives are elected democratically from district youth councils. (Jerusalem, Tel Aviv, Center, Haifa, Arab sector, South, North and the regional schools).
The council comprises youth from the different sectors: religious, secular, Jewish, Arab, Druze and a Bedouin representative.
The National Youth Council representatives mediate between Government decision makers and the Youth representatives. They participate in the various "Knesset" (the Israeli parliament) committees: Education, internal Affairs, Violence, Drugs and Science. Youth representatives participate in committees dealing with youth-related issues such as: children's rights, violence, delinquency and youngsters at risk - cut off from mainstream youth. Youth representatives also participate in discussions concerning matriculation examinations, discussing a national project on school trips, delegations Youth representatives youth, are invited by high officials, ministers and even the president and officials from foreign countries.
Israel's national student and youth council is the first youth council in the world that made student rights legislation. 
In 2006 graduates of the Israel's national student and youth council founded an association named Bematana. The association's mission is to promote young leaders who are elected as representatives in student and youth councils in Israel.
in 2012 the Israel's national student and youth council held the International Youth Leadership Conference under the slogan. "Take The Lead!"

Japan 

Based on alumni associations which were existed as high-level organizations of extracurricular activities, student councils were added to Japanese schools after World War II. In Japanese schools, students in a class stay together as a cohesive set in the same homeroom for most of the day. Each class has one or more elected representatives who reports to student council. The student council consists of members who are elected by the student body. The council is often responsible for organizing events such as the culture festival, sports day, and class field trips. The council also oversees the school clubs, and has absolute influence on school and club policies.

Malaysia 
In Malaysia public secondary schools student councils are usually run and managed by the school's prefects, also known as the Prefectorial Board. They act as the representatives between the students and the teachers. Some schools also have the prefects managed by a few groups of select teachers known as disciplinary teachers, or directly under the head teacher of discipline. Depending on each school's individual system, the Prefectorial Board either have open recruitment for any students interested but requiring them to undergo a year's worth of training and probation, direct recruitment via recommendations made by either teachers or senior prefects (usually students who show excel in their studies and activities) or both. Some schools have the best students from each class selected to be prefects. Positions such as head prefect (the equivalent of student president), assistant head prefect, secretary and treasurers are usually elected by students. Some schools have an internal election among prefects or have the teacher select a few possible candidates for such roles before letting the students vote. These positions form the high council or high committee. Secretary and treasurers sometimes come with assistants, either appointed by the position holder, the committee or they are voted just like the other members. Some schools will have additional positions such as 'Head of Discipline' or 'Head of Statistics' who themselves have a committee of their own to manage different aspects of the school.

Those not part of the high committee are then given roles and positions based on their merit and skills to form different committees to oversee different aspects of the school such as club activities, moral enforcement, school events or even paperwork management. While a prefect's main job is to enforce discipline and be the eyes of the school, those with roles and positions have to carry out their specific duties while managing their responsibilities as prefects. These committees are headed by the high committee members who also have to manage the students and the school. Sometimes, class monitors (who also act as class reps) take part in discussions and meetings held by prefects to better engage with the students. They may also be included as part of the committees but as normal students. Each classroom also has their own committee consisting of roles such as class monitor, assistant monitor, treasurer and secretary to manage things in their own classes.

While prefects enforce the school rules and assist the teachers, they also act as the voice of students when it comes to issues concerning the well-being of students. They essentially have full influence and control over school policies. However, as school laws are created by the Malaysian Ministry of Education, the prefects have no power in amending laws.

Prefects in Malaysian schools can be identified by their distinctive blue uniform that make them stand out from normal students. Primary schools also have a prefectorial board by on a much smaller scale.

Norway 
All schools in Norway are required by law to have a student council elected by the students. The aim of student council is usually to improve their school through encouraging social, cultural and other extracurricular events in the local community. The student councils in Norway are governed by a Board of Directors which is either elected directly or by the student council.

Pakistan 
In Pakistan, Student Councils are being introduced in many Private and Public Schools. Student council are playing an important role in Pakistani schools.

A Student council in Pakistan may be elected, nominated or selected after interview or written examination or both, but can also be based on academic behaviour or discipline.
Sometimes council members are elected based on general elections and if the teacher voted on a good student based on records and grades.

Philippines 
Student governments of different schools throughout the Philippines are often directly elected by student body members of the class or organization which they supposedly govern with all positions (President, Vice President, Secretary, etc.) being separately elected, resulting in a wide variety of mixing and matching between different student political parties. Student governments in the Philippines are often called "Supreme Student Government", or "SSG" in short.

Singapore 
In Singapore many secondary schools have a student council, which provides a medium for communication between the students and the school administration, a form of student welfare, and an important event-organising body. Some secondary schools name their student council like "Student Leader Board" or "Student Leader Committee", etc. They are usually nominated by peers and subsequently elected based on the decision of the teachers overseeing the student leader body.
In Junior Colleges, student councils serve a greater purpose than their younger counterparts. They are given more autonomy in their planning and execution of school events.

Spain 
Most Spanish universities have student councils which are regulated by law. Some of the basic points are the 24% of student representation in the board. Each university council is elected by universal suffrage of the students.

These are organised by regional students councils such as CEUCAT in Catalonia. There is a national students council called CEUNE, which is the interlocutor between the Universities Ministry and the university students.

United Kingdom 
Student Councils (sometimes Student Voice, School Council, Student Parliament, and Student Union) at secondary school level are usually bodies nominated by teachers in state schools (and public and private schools without a house system). There are some regional networks between the representative bodies.

Furthermore, in England, some Student Councils maintain quite a hierarchical structure: the Representatives at the bottom, followed by the Secretary, Treasurer, Vice-chairman and chairman. This latter position is arguably the most important as it is down to this one person to run and organise the council, ensure relevant topics are discussed and—when necessary—remove members.

In Wales, the School Councils (Wales) Regulations 2005 made the establishment of School Councils a statutory requirement on all maintained primary and secondary schools in the country. The regulations also require that Councils meet regularly, that members of the School Council are elected by fellow pupils by means of a secret ballot, and that the School Council can nominate up to two of their number to serve as associate members on the school's Board of Governors.

In universities, the student council is the apex body of the students and members are elected in systematic votings. In many universities, it also functions as an umbrella parliament for students' unions from different institutes.

United States 
Associated student body organizations in the United States function often similarly to others. In most educational systems the council is considered to be an elective/club of individuals working for unity upon their campuses. The club fundraises, supports students, and hosts events such as dances.

Student council in popular culture
Election (1999 film)-American film with Reese Witherspoon and Matthew Broderick

See also
 Student voice
 Student court

References

 
Student culture
Student politics
Student organizations
Student societies by activity
Student Council
Student government
School terminology